The Black Spider is an opera in three acts by Judith Weir with a libretto by the composer. The work is loosely based on the 1842 novella Die schwarze Spinne by Jeremias Gotthelf.

Background
The Black Spider is an opera written for young people. It merges a folk story from Switzerland with a news report from Poland. It combines mystery, history, science, horror and comedy, and asks for skilled acting and singing.

Norman Platt, director of Kent Opera, described how his finance director Robin Jessel lent him a recording of King Harald's Saga by Weir; Platt was much impressed by its originality and having listened to more of her music, met with her, and commissioned a young people's opera with funds from the Arts Council.

The work was first performed in the crypt of Canterbury Cathedral on 6 March 1985, with tenor Armistead Wilkinson and children of the Frank Hooker School; it lasts around one hour and a quarter. Welsh National Youth Opera performed the work at the Millenium Centre in Cardiff in May 2022.

Weir describes the opera's tone as "somewhere between a video nasty and an Ealing comedy".

Synopsis

The opera exploits the collision of two plots and switches back and forth between a Polish legend of the Middle Ages, adapted from Die Schwarze Spinne by Jeremias Gotthelf, and a contemporary newspaper cutting about a curse on the opening of the Tomb of Casimir IV Jagiellon in Wawel Cathedral, Kraków.

The earlier story tells of villagers oppressed by a wicked landlord, the Count Heinrich, and are given the task of carrying an entire beech forest to the mountain-top where he lives. A strange Green Man appears and says he will undertake the task provided the village girl, Christina, weds him. Christina is planning to marry Carl, but nevertheless agrees to the Green Man's bargain to spare the villagers from the Count's violence. The little green man fulfills his pledge as agreed, but Christina naturally breaks her word, wedding Carl. At the ceremony a spider crawls out from her hand, and this then proceeds to cause plague and pestilence in the village. The spider manages to block the exit to the valley, and it seems impossible for the villagers to escape their ravaged home. The spider even kills Count Heinrich by biting into his brain. Finally the disaster is stopped when Christina catches the spider in her cousin Caspar's guitar, and rushes to Kraków to bury it in the tomb of the recently deceased King Casimir IV.

In the modern story, inspired by a 1983 news report in The Times, excavations are taking place at the tomb of Casimir IV, in Wawel Cathedral, Cracow. When the tomb is first opened, a small spider emerges. More and more archaeologists are affected by a deadly virus with no clue to why it is happening.

German version

Conductor and composer Benjamin Gordon was asked by the Staatsoper Hamburg to revise and expand the opera for the 2008/2009 season. The orchestra was expanded to include full strings, augmenting the original clarinets, trumpets. The percussion parts were significantly changed, replacing many of the home-made instruments with traditional percussion instruments. The original guitar part was replaced with a new, prominent harp part. The vocal parts were transposed to allow the singers to use more of their range, and arias and ensembles were extended, using new material based on existing motives. The addition of several new orchestral interludes incorporating bits of the existing music make the work slightly longer (approx. 75 minutes). In comparison to the original orchestration, Gordon's orchestration is still tailored for young players, however for more advanced players than in the original as it is rhythmically more complex. In some places the music became more Transylvanian, in others more sinister, while the "spider" music enables the orchestra share the limelight with the singers. Judith Weir attended the premiere on February 8, 2009. The "Hamburg" Version has been subsequently performed in Bonn (2010), Regensburg (2011), Dortmund (2014) and Leipzig (2017, 2018 & 2022).

References

Operas by Judith Weir
English-language operas
Operas
1985 operas
Operas set in Poland
Operas based on novels
Adaptations of works by Jeremias Gotthelf